Demidovka is a rural locality (a village) in Bolshekochinskoye Rural Settlement, Kochyovsky District, Perm Krai, Russia. The population was 5 as of 2010. There is 1 street.

Geography 
Demidovka is located 28 km northeast of Kochyovo (the district's administrative centre) by road. Abramovka is the nearest rural locality.

References 

Rural localities in Kochyovsky District